Better Call Saul is an American television drama series created by Vince Gilligan and Peter Gould, which premiered in 2015 on AMC. It is a spin-off and prequel to Gilligan's previous series, Breaking Bad (2008–2013). Set primarily in the first half of the 2000s in Albuquerque, New Mexico, the series develops Jimmy McGill (Bob Odenkirk), an earnest lawyer and former con artist, into an egocentric criminal defense attorney known as Saul Goodman. Also shown is the moral decline of former police officer Mike Ehrmantraut (Jonathan Banks), who becomes a violent fixer for drug traffickers to support his granddaughter and her widowed mother. 

Over the course of the series, 63 episodes aired over six seasons. The series premiere aired on February 8, 2015, and the series finale aired on August 15, 2022.

Series overview

Episodes

Season 1 (2015)

Season 2 (2016)

Season 3 (2017)

Season 4 (2018)

Season 5 (2020)

Season 6 (2022)

Ratings
Ratings of AMC cable TV viewers in the United States. Ratings do not include AMC+ and Netflix viewers.

See also
List of Breaking Bad episodes

References

External links
  – official site
 
 

Lists of American crime drama television series episodes